Pergine may refer to:

Pergine Valsugana, a municipality, in Trentino, in the northern Italian region Trentino-Alto Adige/Südtirol
Pergine Valdarno, a municipality, in the Province of Arezzo, in the Italian region Tuscany